Cruckton is a small village in Shropshire, England.  Cruckton is situated approximately five miles from Shrewsbury town centre, off the B4386 road to Montgomery, Powys. The postcode begins SY5. It is within the civil parish of Pontesbury and the Shrewsbury and Atcham parliamentary constituency.

Village
In 1870–72, John Marius Wilson's The Imperial Gazetteer of England and Wales described Cruckton like this:

"CRUCKTON, a chapelry, with a village, in Pontesbury parish, Salop; 3 miles WSW of Shrewsbury town and r[ailway]. station. Post town, Shrewsbury. Real property,[value] £4,981. Pop[ulation]., 155. The property is divided among a few. Cruckton Hall is the seat of the Harrieses. The living is a p[erpetual]. curacy, annexed to the second Pontesbury rectory, in the diocese of Hereford. The church is good."

The village has a crescent of council-built houses, called Church Close (originally Rural Cottages).  They were built in 1949, close to St Thomas' Church.  The latter was built (with Edward Haycock as architect) as a daughter church to the then parish church at Pontesbury in 1840 and closed by 1985, since when it has been a private home called Church House. At the time of the crescent's building the site of a Roman villa was found on the green.

Cruckton's publicly funded Cruckton Hall School, opened in 1978, is for boys with special needs or behavioural challenges associated with autism spectrum disorders, including autism and Asperger syndrome.

Notable people
Sir Thomas Harries, 1st Baronet (1550-1628), lawyer, was son of a Cruckton landed family.
Sir Richard Jenkins, Chairman of the East India Company and M.P. for Shrewsbury 1837–41, was born at Cruckton, on 18 February 1785.  
Civil engineer Sir William Francis lives at Cruckton.

See also 
 Listed buildings in Pontesbury
 Cruckmeole

References

External links 

 Cruckton Hall School

Villages in Shropshire